is a Japanese football player for J.FC Miyazaki.

Club statistics
Updated to 1 January 2020.

References

External links
Profile at Fujieda MYFC

1988 births
Living people
Kokushikan University alumni
Association football people from Tokyo
Japanese footballers
J2 League players
J3 League players
Japan Football League players
FC Machida Zelvia players
Fujieda MYFC players
J.FC Miyazaki players
Association football defenders